is a fictional character in the Soulcalibur series of video games. Created by Namco's Project Soul division, he first appeared in Soulcalibur and its subsequent sequels, later appearing in various merchandise related to the series.

Introduced in the original Soulcalibur, Astaroth is a golem created by a cult worshiping the Greek god of war Ares to locate a cursed sword named "Soul Edge". Though Astaroth has consistently pursued the sword, his character has changed as the series progresses, eventually transforming into a power hungering creature desiring to consume the sword. Regarded as an iconic character of the series, Astaroth has been noted as fitting a gigantism character stereotype seen in fighting games, featuring strong attacks but slow speed. Astaroth has been described as having easy-to-master gameplay and being popular with fans of strong, hard-hitting characters in fighting games.

Conception and creation

As a character introduced in Soulcalibur, Astaroth's weapon, a giant axe, was decided upon before other aspects of the character were. His design revolved around it, starting with gender, then physical measurements, and lastly background details. Once established, his appearance and movement were fleshed out by the team's concept artist Aya Takemura and rendered as a 3D model by a design team that worked solely on the character. Astaroth was then animated mainly by Nobuko Nimura using motion capture and working directly with the team, while other motion designers created the movements for his grapple attacks. During this phase the team additionally worked with the Soulcalibur story creators, refining the character's own role in the plot as needed throughout development. Soulcalibur IV lead programmer Masaaki Hoshino called Astaroth his favorite character, stating that because he is "so powerful there's always a chance to make a comeback".

During development, a golem devoid of facial features, armed with a sword and shield, and accompanied by a small girl was considered as a possible character, but scrapped. Before finalizing his appearance several other designs were considered, ranging from a Frankenstein's monster-inspired character to a medieval berserker. Despite having a male voice and physical build, Astaroth was referred to as "it" in terms of gender for the character's Soulcalibur background information. However the background information in other character profiles instead refer to him as male, and his background information in later titles followed suit.

Design
Astaroth is shown to be a large, muscular, bald, dark-skinned humanoid with solid white eyes. A black mask wraps around and covers the lower portion of his head, while a black open gorget covers the nape of his neck and spiked spaulders cover his shoulders. Black spiked braces and boots cover his hands to the elbows and feet to the knees respectively, and black garters wrap around the middle of each thigh. A large black belt surrounds his abdomen supporting a fauld and cloth loincloth. Two black straps of leather crisscross the vertical center of his chest from the gorget to the belt, in between which lies his exposed, protruding heart. During development of the design, a flame positioned over his head alongside flaming eyes were considered, but were cut from the finished product. Astaroth stands 7 feet 3 inches tall, making him the largest character with a recorded height in the series.

In subsequent titles of the series Astaroth's appearance changed, showing more signs of damage and armor loss in II and in III shifting to a dark maroon skintone. By Soulcalibur IV, Astaroth's appearance was completely changed, altered to resemble a "rugged rocky" golem. Facial features were completely removed, replaced with a large-mawed fractured head design with a headscarf covering the area around his forehead, eyes, and the back of his head. The remaining areas of his body featured several cracks over his build with red veins glowing from within. Large stone spikes jutted from each shoulder, while a similar pair jutted from each knee. Broken metal armor pieces protected his arms, legs, and chest, while a fauld surrounded his waist. Fans reacted negatively to the character's modified appearance once unveiled, complaining it was "monster-ish". For Soulcalibur IV they returned to his original design but enhanced it to be more massive and vicious, using a design motif that represented a serpent, the symbol of the in-game cult that created him. As his body itself is a weapon they chose not to hide too much of the character's skin, especially the core 'heart' at the center of his chest.

In most Soulcalibur titles, Astaroth's secondary character models contrast heavily against his primary design. Amongst these have included designs with several bone or spike protrusions from Astaroth's body, to designs inspired by punk fashion. This trend was discontinued in Soulcalibur IV, where his appearance from Soulcalibur was reused instead.

In video games 
Introduced in Soulcalibur, Astaroth is a golem created by a cult of Ares to retrieve the cursed sword known as Soul Edge. Upon finding the blade, Astaroth realizes that it is damaged and allies himself with its wielder Nightmare to harvest living souls necessary to restore the blade, planning to steal the blade once completed. However, before he can complete this task, he is confronted by a survivor of his attacks, Maxi, and is slain. Revived by Ares in Soulcalibur II, Astaroth continues after the sword. However, the cult that created him regards this as a betrayal, and places a curse on the golem to dominate him. Astaroth resists and counterattacks the cult, learning in the process his design is not original but instead modeled after a human being, Rock. To assert himself as unique, Astaroth finds and nearly kills Rock at the conclusion of Soulcalibur III, breaking free of Ares' control and transforming in the aftermath. Now hungering for power, he is offered it in return for servitude to Nightmare during the events of Soulcalibur IV, an offer he accepts with the secret goal of devouring Soul Edge itself. Destroyed instead by Maxi, Astaroth's heart is retrieved by the cult responsible for his creation, and a new series of golems all bearing the name "Astaroth" are created from research conducted upon it. Astaroth's story mode in Soulcalibur VI is a retelling of his creation and service to Nightmare, though now he is aided by a ker, sent by Ares to aid him in obtaining Soul Edge.

Outside of the main games in the Soulcalibur series, Astaroth also appears in a Dreamcast VMU mini-game called "Cannon Dare", in which the player must shoot him out of a cannon by guessing the correct fuse, and later as a playable character in Namco's Pac-Man Fever. Astaroth also appears briefly in Soulcalibur: Broken Destinys Gauntlet storyline, a side story set after the events of Soulcalibur IV, tearing through a forest and challenging the protagonist and allies after they defeat a rampaging Maxi. In the prequel Soulcalibur Legends, a similar prototype golem, Astaroth α, is discovered by game protagonist Siegfried. Upon defeat, he joins Siegfried's party as a playable character.

Gameplay 
Astaroth's gameplay was developed around the concept of a powerful fighter that struck at a distance, and has been noted as one of the strongest characters in the Soulcalibur series, requiring few mistakes to be made when fighting against Astaroth to defeat him. Measures were put into effect to make the character unique by allowing the player to hold attack buttons in order to strengthen attacks, to contrast against other large character fighting styles in Soulcalibur such as Nightmare's multiple fighting stances.

Though noted as having slow attacks, Astaroth has been described as being an easy-to-learn character capable of dealing high amounts of damage, though his advantages and disadvantages have been described as part of the "big guy" role he has in the game's roster. Several of his attacks cover a wide range, while several of his grapple attacks allow room to deal with various defensive measures by opponents. Other attacks such as "Poseidon Tide" allow Astaroth to control the opponent's distance from himself while simultaneously dealing damage, with the additional feature of offering defensive measures of their own.

Promotion and reception 
In 2000, Epoch C-Works released a series of action figures based on characters from the original Soulcalibur, amongst them Astaroth. The semi-posable figure of Astaroth was packaged with equipable weapons from the title. In August 2003, Todd McFarlane Productions released an Astaroth sculpture amongst a set of five based on characters from Soulcalibur II. The immobile figure was modeled after his secondary outfit and stood six inches tall with a base.

Astaroth has been described as one of the "staple" and "stalwart" characters of the Soulcalibur franchise by GameTrailers. Australian GamePro noted his size gave the character great reach in terms of gameplay, though said attacks could easily be anticipated and his recovery speed was slow. University of Delaware professor Rachel Hutchinson cited him as an example of the cultural stereotype of human versus monster, a "mutated or damned [creature] deviant from the human norm" that the game's human characters are expected to vanquish. GameDaily named him one of their favorite heavily muscled characters in video games, noting his strength and the impact of his weapon. Insert Credit Tim Rogers stated "It takes a certain kind of gamer to prefer Astaroth", noting him as a character popular with fans of "kickass" or "evil" characters. The New York Times noted his size and appearance alongside Nightmare's as standouts in the series, adding "they offer characters made for the sort of player who would have preferred Sonny Liston to Muhammad Ali, or Shaquille O'Neal to Michael Jordan". In 2013, Complex listed him the tenth best character in the series out of a top twenty, noting his similarity to Rock but complimenting his design as superior and "just plain badass".

Notes

References

External links

 Soulcalibur page for Astaroth, courtesy of The Wayback Machine

Fantasy video game characters
Fictional people of the Persian Empire
Fictional golems
Fictional characters with gigantism
Fictional axefighters
Fictional mass murderers
Fictional Iranian people
Male characters in video games
Soulcalibur series characters
Undead characters in video games
Video game characters introduced in 1998

pt:Anexo:Lista de personagens da série Soul#Astaroth